Amani Makoe (born 20 February 1991) is a Fijian footballer who plays as a defender for Nadroga in the Fijian National Football League.

References

1991 births
Living people
Fijian footballers
Association football defenders
Fiji international footballers
2016 OFC Nations Cup players
Rewa F.C. players
Fijian expatriate footballers
Fijian expatriate sportspeople in Vanuatu
Expatriate footballers in Vanuatu